Kacher Manush is a 2022 Indian Bengali-language drama film written and directed by Pathikrit Basu. It is produced by Dev under the banner of Dev Entertainment Ventures. The film stars Prosenjit Chatterjee, along with Dev, and Ishaa Saha. The story revolves around Kuntol and Sudarshan who meet when they are at their lowest. On hearing Kuntol's story, Sudarshan gets a dangerous and illegal idea that can solve both their problems. It results in a hide and seek game with life.

Cast 
 Prosenjit Chatterjee as Sudarshan Ghosh
 Dev as Kuntal Sarkar
 Ishaa Saha as Aalo/Kusum
 Ranjit Mullick as industrialist Bikash Sengupta (cameo)
 Susmita Chatterjee as Asha(cameo)
 Sanjib Sarkar as local leader Sadeq Ali

Soundtrack

Release 
The film was released theatrically on 30 September 2022 coinciding Durga Puja.

References 

2020s Bengali-language films
Bengali-language Indian films
Indian drama films